The following is a timeline of the history of the city of Budapest, Hungary.

Before 16th century

 BCE.  - Neolithic, Chalcolithic-, Bronze and Iron Age cultures, Celtic and Eravisci settlements on present day Budapest.

 1st C. CE - Romans found the settlements known as Aquincum, Contra-Aquincum and Campona. Aquincum becomes the largest town of the Danubian region and one of the capitals of Pannonia.
 376 CE - Aquincum invaded by the Huns.
 5th C. - The Age of Huns. King Attila builds a city for himself here according to later chronicles. After his death, the sons of his brother controlled the united Hun tribes.
 896 - Following the foundation of Hungary, Árpád, leader of the Hungarians, settles in the "Town of Attila", usually identified as Aquincum.
 10th C. - Out of the seven to ten Hungarian tribes, four have settlements in the territory of modern Budapest: Megyer, Keszi, Jenő and Nyék.
 end of 10th C. - Magyars came into the country and preserved the names of Buda and Pest.
 1015 - Matthias Church established (approximate date).
 1046 - Bishop Gerard of Csanád dies at the hands of pagans on present-day Gellért Hill.
 1241 - Mongol invasion destroys both towns.
 1244 - Created a royal free city by Bela IV.
 1248 - King Béla IV builds the first royal castle on Castle Hill, Buda. The new town adopts the name of Buda from the earlier one (present day Óbuda). Pest is surrounded by city walls.
 1255 - Matthias Church reconstruction begins.
 1265 - Buda Castle first completed.
 1270 - Saint Margaret of Hungary dies in a cloister on the Isle of Rabbits (present day Margaret Island).
 1320 - Royal wedding of King Charles I of Hungary and Princess Elizabeth of Poland, Hungarian–Polish alliance formed.
 1361 - Buda became the capital of Hungary.
 1458 - The noblemen of Hungary elect Matthias Corvinus (in Latin) or Hunyadi Mátyás (in Hungarian) as king on the ice of the Danube. Under his reign Buda becomes a main hub of European Renaissance. He dies in 1490, after capturing Vienna in 1485.
 1472 - Printing press established in Buda.

16th to 18th centuries
 1526 - 26 November: Buda taken by forces of Ottman Suleyman.
 1530 - Siege of Buda (1530).
 1540 - .
 1541
 Siege of Buda (1541).
 Buda becomes part of the Ottoman Empire. The Turkish Pashas build multiple mosques and baths in Buda.
 Budin Eyalet established.
 1542 - Siege of Pest.
 1550 - Rudas Baths built.
 1566 -  becomes .

 1602 - An unsuccessful assault on Budapest under Field Marshal Hermann Christof von Russwurm (2 October - 15 November 1602).
 1686 - Battle of Buda (1686). Buda and Pest are reconquered from the Turks with Habsburg leadership. Both towns are destroyed completely in the battles.
 1690s - Resettlement, initially only a few hundred German settlers.
 1699 - By the Treaty of Karlowitz  the emperor of Austria undertook to preserve a small octagonal Turkish mosque beneath which is the grave of a Turkish monk.
 1723 - Pest became the seat of the highest Hungarian officials.
 1769 - Buda Castle reconstruction completed.
 1771 - Citadel built in Buda.
 1773 - Election of the first Mayor of Pest.
 1777 - Maria Theresa of Austria moves Nagyszombat University to Castle Hill in Buda.
 1783 - Joseph II places the acting government (Helytartótanács) and Magyar Kamara on Buda.
 1795 - 20 May - Ignác Martinovics and other Jacobin leaders are executed on Vérmező or 'The Field of Blood'.
 1799 - Combined population: 54,179.

19th century

 1810 - A fire in the Tabán district.
 1811 - City Park laid out in Pest.
 1823 - Fasori Gimnázium (school) founded.
 1825 - Commencement of the Reform Era. Pest becomes the cultural and economic centre of the country. The first National Theatre is built, along with the Hungarian National Museum.
 1830 - Steamboat to Vienna begins operating.
 1833 - Vigadó Concert Hall opens in Pest.
 1836 -  founded.
 1838 - . The biggest flood in recent memory in March completely inundates Pest.
 1839 - Industrial flour mill begins operating.
 1844 - Ganz Works iron foundry in business in Buda.
 1846 - Vác-Budapest railway begins operating.
 1848 - 15 March - Start of the Revolution and War of Independence of 1848-49. Pest replaces Pozsony/Pressburg (Bratislava) as the new capital of Hungary and seat of the Batthyány government and the Parliament.
 1849
 5 January: Austrians occupy the city.
 April: Hungarian Honvédsereg (Army of National Defense) reclaims city, taking the fortress of Buda on May 21 after an 18-day Battle of Buda (1849).
 July: Habsburg army again captures the two towns.
 6 October - Lajos Batthyány, the first Hungarian Prime Minister is executed on the present-day Szabadság tér.
 Széchenyi Lánchíd, or Széchenyi Chain Bridge, the first permanent bridge across the Danube in Budapest was opened linking Buda (West bank) and Pest (East bank).

 1851 - Leopoldstadt Basilica, a Romanesque building begun.
 1853 - Budapest Philharmonic Orchestra founded.
 1857 - Pest Academy of Commerce founded.
 1859 - Dohány Street Synagogue consecrated in Pest.
 1860 - Raitzenbad (bath) rebuilt.
 1864 - Vigadó Concert Hall built.
 1865
 Esterhazy Gallery of art established.
 Hungarian Academy of Sciences building constructed in Pest.
 University of Theatre and Film Arts in Budapest established.
 1867
 8 June: Coronation of Franz Joseph as King of Hungary.
 Austro-Hungarian Compromise of 1867, followed by unprecedented civic development, resulting in the style of present-day Budapest.
 Budapesti Közlöny government newspaper headquartered in Pest.
 1868
 Municipal council established in Pest.
  humor magazine headquartered in Pest.
 Leopold Basilica built in Pest.
 1869
  restaurant in business.
 Margaret Island park opens.
 Geological Museum of Budapest established.
 Combined population: 270,685.
 1870
  (metro planning entity) established.
 Zagreb-Budapest railway begins operating.
 Café Gerbeaud moves to Régi Színház Square.
 1872
 Military academy built in Pest.
 Rumbach Street Synagogue built.

1873–1900

 1873
 17 November: The former cities: Pest, Buda and Óbuda are united, and with that the Hungarian capital is established with the name of Budapest.
  becomes Mayor of Budapest
 Coat of arms of Budapest design adopted.
 Budapesti Szemle scholarly journal headquartered in city.
 1874
 Budapest Cog-wheel Railway service is inaugurated.
 Customhouse built.
  newspaper headquartered in city.
 1875
 26 June: Storm.
 Liszt Academy of Music founded.
 1876
 Andrássy Avenue opens.
 Margaret Bridge built.
 1877
 Budapest-Nyugati Railway Terminal opens.
  founded.
 1878
 Electric public lighting installed in the city centre.
  newspaper in publication.
  humor magazine begins publication.
 1880 - Combined population: 360,551.
 1881
 Budapesti Hírlap newspaper begins publication.
 Population: 370,767 (75,794 in Buda + 294,973 in Pest).

 1884
 Budapest Keleti railway station opens.
 Hungarian State Opera House opens.
 1885
 Dobos torte (cake) introduced.
 16 June: Újpest FC football club founded.
 1886
 Budapest Opera Ball begins.
 Manfred Weiss Ammunition Factory begins operating near city. 
 1887 - the first Electric tram begins operating.
 1888 - MTK Budapest FC football club founded.
 1891 - Population: 491,938.
 1892 - Cholera epidemic.
 1893
 Electric power plant built.
 Electrification of Budapest finished.
 1894
 March: Funeral of Lajos Kossuth.
 Aquincum Museum and New York Café open.
  (art society) founded.
 Wampetics (later Gundel) restaurant in business
 New York Palace Hotel opens.

 1895
 January: Budapest hosts the 1895 European Figure Skating Championships.
 Hall of Art, Budapest built.
 1896
 Budapest Metro begins operating.
 .
 Franz Joseph Bridge, Grand Boulevard, and Museum of Applied Arts built.
 1899
 Hungarian Transportation Museum opens.
  active.
 Institute of Geology built.
 3 May: Ferencvárosi TC football club founded.
 1900
 Heroes' Square constructed, with its .
 Population: 732,222.

20th century

1901–1945
 1901
 21 December: Economic unrest.
 Postal Savings Bank built.
  founded near city.
 1902
 Hungarian Parliament Building construction completed.
 Fortuna cinema opens.
 1903
  built.
 Elisabeth Bridge and Varosliget Picture House open.
 1904 - Thalia Theatre opens.
 1905
 Museum of Fine Arts built.
 St. Stephen's Basilica reconstruction completed.
 1906
 István Bárczy becomes mayor.
 Gresham Palace built.
 1908 - Nyugat literary magazine begins publication.
 1909
 January: Budapest hosts the 1909 European Figure Skating Championships and co-hosts the 1909 World Figure Skating Championships.
 Athletic Club of Kispest established.
 Endre Nagy cabaret active.
 1909–1910 - Electric public lighting expanded to the suburbs, the nearby towns villages had Electric public lighting.

 1910
 Population: The census finds 880,000 people in Budapest and 55,000 in the largest suburb of Újpest (now part of Budapest).
 1911 - Budapest hosts the 1911 European Wrestling Championships.
 1913 - Bozsik Stadion (stadium) built.
 1915 - A Tett cultural magazine begins publication.
 1916 - Helios cinema and Magyar Zsidó Museum open.
 1918
 31 October: Socialist Aster Revolution begins. Revolution and the 133 days of the Hungarian Republic of Councils (March–August 1919) under the leadership of Béla Kun. It is the first Communist government to be formed in Europe after the October Revolution in Russia.
 1919
 21 March: City becomes capital of the Hungarian Soviet Republic.
 6 August: French-supported Romanian forces enter city. The Communist government collapsed and its leaders fled. In retaliation for the Red Terror, reactionary crews now exacted revenge in a two-year wave of violent repression known today as the White Terror.
 1 November: Budapest becomes capital of the Hungarian Democratic Republic, established by Mihály Károlyi.
 14 November: Romanian occupation ends.
 16 November: Miklós Horthy and National Army enter Budapest; regency government established in 1920.
 1920 - Corvinus University of Budapest founded.
 1921
  newspaper begins publication.
 Population: 1,184,616.
 18 December: 1921 Hungary v Poland football match.
 1924 - Hungarian National Bank is founded.
 1925 - Hungarian Radio commences broadcasting.
 1926
 Forum Cinema active.
 1929 - Budapest co-hosts the 1929 World Figure Skating Championships.
 1930 - Population: 1,442,869.
 1933
 Disassembly of the Tabán commences.
 April: National Socialist demonstrations.
 August: Budapest hosts the 1933 European Rowing Championships.
 Budapest hosts the 1933 World Fencing Championships.
 1934
 Józef Bem monument unveiled.
 MAFC basketball team founded.
 1935
 February: Budapest co-hosts the 1935 World Figure Skating Championships.
 August: Budapest hosts the 1935 International University Games.
 1937 - Petőfi Bridge built.
 1938
  active.
 Barlang cinema opens.
 1939 - 24 May: Polish Institute in Budapest opened (see also Hungary–Poland relations).
 1944
 19 March - German forces occupy Budapest. At the time of the occupation, there were 184,000 Jews and between 65,000 and 80,000 Christians of Jewish descent in the town. The Arrow Cross collaborated with the Germans in murdering Jews. Fewer than half of Budapest's Jews (approximately 119,000) survived the following 11 months.
 19 March: Polish Institute in Budapest closed following German occupation.
 3 November: Budapest Offensive by Soviet forces begins.
 26 December: Siege of Budapest begins.
 1945
 15–18 January: Soviet and Romanian troops besiege Budapest. The retreating Germans destroy all Danube bridges. On 18 January, the Soviets complete the occupation of Pest.
 13 February: The Buda castle falls; Siege of Budapest ends. World War II took the lives of close to 200,000 Budapest residents and caused widespread damage to the buildings of the city.

1946–1990s

 1946
 Kossuth Bridge built.
 Széll Kálmán Square renamed "Moscow Square."
 1947 - Liberty Statue (Budapest) erected.
 1949 - City becomes capital of the Hungarian People's Republic.
 1950
 May: Budapest hosts the EuroBasket Women 1950.
 November: Árpád Bridge opens.
 Budapesti Honvéd SE basketball team founded.
 1951 - Polish Institute in Budapest reopened.
 1952 - Esti Budapest newspaper begins publication.
 1954 - 1954 Hungary v England football match.
 1955
 January: Budapest hosts the 1955 European Figure Skating Championships.
 June: Budapest hosts the EuroBasket 1955.

 1956
 12 January – A magnitude 5.8 earthquake strikes, killing two and injuring 38 others.
 23 October–4 November – The Hungarian Revolution of 1956 breaks out, crushed by the invasion of a large Soviet force.
 Népszabadság newspaper headquartered in city.
 1959
 Budapest hosts the 1959 World Fencing Championships.
  of film established.
 1960s - Wartime damage is largely repaired.
 1963
 February: Budapest hosts the 1963 European Figure Skating Championships.
 Rákosi bunker built.
 December: Budapest hosts the 1963 World Rhythmic Gymnastics Championships.
 1964 - Elizabeth Bridge rebuilt, the final bridge to be repaired postwar.
 1965 - Budapest hosts the 1965 Summer Universiade.
 1966 - Budapest hosts the 1966 European Athletics Championships.
 1968
 Budapest Transport established.
  art group active.
 1969 - Marriott hotel built.
 1970 - The first phase of the East-Western Metro begin operating.
 1972 - Moszkva tér (Budapest Metro) opens at Moscow Square.
 1974
 Rubik's Cube invented.
 Population: 2,051,354.
 1975 - Budapest-Déli Railway Terminal built.
 1976
 The first phase of the North-Southern Metro begins.
 Hilton hotel built.
 1977 - Budapest Treaty signed.
 1979 - Artpool founded.
 1983
 March: Budapest hosts the 1983 European Athletics Indoor Championships.
 April: Budapest hosts the 1983 European Wrestling Championships.
 Budapest Festival Orchestra founded.
 1985 - Petőfi Csarnok youth center opens.
 1987
 Budapest designated an UNESCO World Heritage Site.
  renamed "Church Square."
 1988 - Budapest hosts the 1988 World Figure Skating Championships.
 1989 - City becomes part of the Third Hungarian Republic.
 1990
 Gábor Demszky becomes mayor.
 Budapest Stock Exchange re-established.
 Population: The city is home to 2,016,100 residents.
 Gyöngyösi utca (Budapest Metro) opens.
 1991 - Budapest hosts the 1991 World Fencing Championships.
 1992 - Kempinski Hotel Corvinus in business.
 1995 - Rákóczi Bridge opens.
 1996
 March: Budapest co-hosts the 1996 European Wrestling Championships.
 European Roma Rights Center established.
 Polus Center (shopping mall),  shopping mall, and Corvin cinema established.
 1997 - Budapest Pride event begins.
 1998 - Budapest hosts the 1998 European Athletics Championships.
 1999 - WestEnd City Center shopping mall in business.
 2000 - Buda Health Center established.

21st century
 2001 - December: International academics meet in Budapest, formulate "Open Access" statement.
 2002
 August: Flood.
 National Theatre (Budapest) rebuilt.
 Andrássy Avenue is added to the list of World heritage Sites, along with the Millennium Underground railway and Heroes' Square.
 2004
 1 May: Hungary joins the European Union.
 Budapest City Archives new building opens.
 December: Budapest co-hosts the 2004 European Women's Handball Championship.
 2006
 September–October: Anti-government protests in Kossuth Lajos square.
 Budapest Fringe Festival begins.
 200 km of the 1000 km road in capital level local government handling is reconstructed after 80 km in the former year. The world's longest trams, Siemens Combino Supras start service on Grand Boulevard, by the end of the year 150 Volvo 7700 buses take part in replacing the aging BKV fleet. Reconstruction of metro line 2 finishes.
 2008
 The Eastern part of the M0 motorway around the city with Megyeri Bridge is finished and given to public. The new Northern Railway Bridge is finished and is opened to public.
 By this year 400 km road  have been reconstructed due to the road reconstruction program paired with pipe (heating and water) replacements to modern, narrow and heat-conserving ones, and where needed sewer system expansion or replacement.
 2009 - The 2007-2009 complete reconstruction of Liberty Bridge finishes.
 2010
 István Tarlós becomes mayor.
 The Central Wastewater Treatment Plant starts its normal operation. This increases biologically treated sewage from 51% to 100%.
 2011
 The 2009-2011 complete and historical reconstruction of Margaret Bridge finishes.
 Monument to the victims of the Katyn massacre unveiled by Presidents of Hungary and Poland.
 Population: 1,729,040 city; 3,284,110 metro.
 2012 - Protest related to new Constitution of Hungary.
 2014
 First phase of Line 4 (Budapest Metro) opens for use by the public.
 2014 Hungarian Internet tax protests.
 2015
 June: Budapest co-hosts the EuroBasket Women 2015.
 September: Demonstration by migrants.
 2016
 March: Share of modern, air conditioned low-floor buses increases over 80%.
 July–August: Budapest hosts the 2016 European Lacrosse Championship.
 October: Budapest hosts the 2016 European Table Tennis Championships.
 October: Monument to Polish solidarity and aid for the Hungarian Revolution of 1956 unveiled.
 December: Budapest hosts the 2016 World Wrestling Championships.
 2017
 May: Budapest hosts the 2017 Rhythmic Gymnastics European Championships.
 26 June: Henryk Sławik and József Antall monument unveiled.
 July: Budapest hosts the 2017 World Aquatics Championships.
 August–September: Budapest hosts the 2017 World Judo Championships.
 2018
 April: Monument to the victims of the Smolensk air disaster unveiled.
 October: Budapest hosts the 2018 World Wrestling Championships.
 2019
 July: Budapest hosts the 2019 World Fencing Championships.
 September: Budapest hosts the 2019 World Modern Pentathlon Championships.
 2021
 May: Budapest co-hosts the 2020 European Aquatics Championships.
 June: Budapest hosts the 2021 World Judo Championships.
 2022
 January: Budapest co-hosts the 2022 European Men's Handball Championship.
 June–July: Budapest co-hosts the 2022 World Aquatics Championships.

See also
 History of Budapest
 , 1541-1686 (includes list of names)
  (főpolgármesterek), since 1873
 List of mayors (:hu:Budapest polgármestereinek listája), since 1873
 List of city council presidents (:hu:Budapest tanácselnökeinek listája), since 1950
 History of Pest (in Hungarian)
 Other names of Budapest
 List of sights and historic places in Budapest
 Timelines of other cities in Hungary: Debrecen

References

This article incorporates information from the Hungarian Wikipedia and German Wikipedia.

Bibliography

in English
 
 
 
 
 
 
 
 
 
 
 
 
 
 
 
 
 
  (about Budapest)

in other languages

External links

 
Budapest
Hungary history-related lists
Years in Hungary
Budapest